Oxymycterus is a genus of rat-like rodents commonly known as hocicudos. They are endemic to South America. , the genus contains the following 16 species:
 O. akodontius  Argentine hocicudo
 O. amazonicus  Amazon hocicudo
 O. angularis  angular hocicudo
 O. caparaoe  Caparao hocicudo
 O. dasytrichus  Atlantic Forest hocicudo
 O. delator  spy hocicudo
 O. hiska  small hocicudo
 O. hispidus  hispid hocicudo
 O. hucucha  Quechuan hocicudo
 O. inca  Incan hocicudo
 O. itapeby  Itapevi hocicudo rat
 O. josei  Cook's hocicudo
 O. paramensis Paramo hocicudo
 O. quaestor  Quaestor hocicudo
 O. roberti  Robert's hocicudo
 O. rufus  red hocicudo
 O. wayku  ravine hocicudo

Citations

References

 
 
 
 
 

 
Rodent genera